The Life Story of John Lee, or The Man They Could Not Hang may refer to:

 The Life Story of John Lee, or The Man They Could Not Hang (1912 film), a 1912 Australian silent film
 The Life Story of John Lee, or The Man They Could Not Hang (1921 film), a 1921 Australian silent film